Homenetmen is a pan-Armenian sports and scouting organization.

Homenetmen may also refer to:

Homenetmen Lebanon, a multi-sports club based in Lebanon
Homenetmen Antelias
Homenetmen Beirut
Homenetmen Beirut (football)
Homenetmen Beirut (basketball)
Homenetmen Bourj Hammoud
Al-Yarmouk SC, formerly Homenetmen Aleppo, a sports club based in Aleppo, Syria
Al-Yarmouk SC (football)
Al-Yarmouk SC (men's basketball)
Al-Yarmouk SC (women's basketball)
 FC Pyunik, formerly Homenetmen Yerevan, a sports club based in Yerevan, Armenia
 Kilikia FC, formerly Homenetmen AOSS Yerevan, a football club based in Yerevan, Armenia

See also
Homenmen (disambiguation)